The American Thoroughbred Owners and Breeders Association (TOBA) based in  Lexington, Kentucky is a trade organization for Thoroughbred racehorse owners and breeders. Founded in 1961, the TOBA's stated mission is to "improve the economics, integrity and pleasure of the sport on behalf of Thoroughbred owners and breeders."

Through its American Graded Stakes Committee, the TOBA is responsible for annually evaluating and setting a Graded stakes race designation for races in the United States whose recent editions have consistently represented the highest quality competition. TOBA is also represented on the board of directors of the National Thoroughbred Racing Association as a founding member and on the American Horse Council. The Blood-Horse is a publication of the Thoroughbred Owners and Breeders Association.

Daniel J. Metzger has been president of the association since 1999.

References
 The Thoroughbred Owners and Breeders Association official website
 Thirteen Fewer Graded Stakes for 2011
 Two Fewer Graded Stakes for 2010
 Seven Additional Graded Stakes for 2009

1961 establishments in Kentucky
Horse racing organizations in the United States
Graded stakes races in the United States
Horse racing
Sports organizations established in 1961
Organizations based in Lexington, Kentucky